Samashki (Semajaşka) is a rural locality (a selo) in Achkhoy-Martanovsky District, Chechnya. Samashki is the administrative center and only settlement of the Samashkinskoye rural settlement. Its population was estimated at 12,769 in 2021.

Geography 

Samashki is located on the left bank of the Sunzha River.

From the north, the hills of the Sunzhensky ridge reach the village, and from the south, the Samashki Forestry and the Sunzha River.

The nearest settlements to Samashki are Raduzhnoye to the north-east, Zakan-Yurt to the east, Novy Sharoy to the south, Davydenko to the south-west, and Sernovodskoye to the west.

Name 

History 
Samashki was founded in 1851, as a part of the Sunzhensky Cossack line, on the site of the destroyed Chechen village of Lower Samashki. In 1920, the entire Cossack population of the village was evicted by order of Sergo Ordzhonikidze. The village was then given back to the Chechens, who repopulated it.

In 1944, after the genocide and deportation of the Chechen and Ingush people and the abolition of the Chechen-Ingush ASSR, the village of Samashki was renamed and settled by people from other ethnic groups. From 1944 to 1957, it was a part of the Novoselsky District of Grozny Oblast.

In 1958, after the Vainakh people returned and the Chechen-Ingush ASSR was restored, the village regained its old name, Samashki.

Samashki in the Chechen Wars 
During both Chechen Wars the village suffered greatly from the hostilities, most notably in the notorious April 1995 incident known as Samashki massacre committed by the Internal Troops of Russia which resulted in the deaths of 100 to 300 civilians.

In March 1996 another attack on the town took the form of a full-scale assault with apparent disregard for civilian lives; according to Human Rights Watch, Russian forces used civilians as a human shields on APCs. Reports suggested some 500 civilians were killed as a result of the April 1995 and March 1996 attacks. The next month, Russian journalist Nadezhda Chaikova, who had filmed the effects of the 1996 attack, was killed execution-style in Chechnya.

A devastating artillery and rocket attack on Samashki took place in October 1999 at the beginning of the Second Chechen War, despite the demilitarization of the village, killing or injuring dozens of residents on October 27, 1999 alone, according to HRW. At the time, the deputy commander of the North Caucasus Military District announced that there were only "bandits and terrorists" in Samashki, but a report for the British parliament claimed civilians were killed in revenge for the heavy casualties suffered there by Russian forces during the first war.

Federal forces reported a large-scale operation in Samashki in May 2000.

Population 
 1979 Census: 9,185
 1990 Census: 9,945
 2002 Census: 10,824
 2010 Census: 11,275
 2019 estimate: 12,597
2021 estimate: 12,769

According to the results of the 2010 Census, the majority of residents of Samashki (11,263 or 99.9%) were ethnic Chechens, with 12 people (0.1%) coming from other ethnic backgrounds.

Teips 
Members of the following teips (clans) live in Samashki:
 Nashkhoy
 Zandak
 Sharoy 
 Zumsoy
 Terloy 
 Nuokhoy
 Galay
 Akkiy
 Keloy
 Cheberloy
 Dai
 Nizhloy
 Gukhoy
 Kesaloy
 Khimoy
 Khakmadoy
 Shikaroy
 Chanti
 Buosoy

Famous natives 
 Lyoma Satuyev, Honored Artist of the Chechen Republic, theater and film actor;
 Usman Dadayev, tightrope walker, People's Artist of the Chechen Republic, Honored Artist of the Republic of Ingushetia;
 Mikhail Ivanyukov,  Hero of Socialist Labor;
 Prokofi Kalashnikov, Hero of the Soviet Union, colonel, tanker;
 Shumisat Khazhmukhambetova, sambo wrestler and judoka, champion of the USSR, silver medalist of the Spartakiad of the peoples of the USSR, master of sports of the USSR in sambo and judo.

Transportation 
Also, a railway line from Nazran to Grozny passes through the village. Part of the village is located beyond the railway.

References

External links
 

Rural localities in Achkhoy-Martanovsky District